The Haunted Mansion is a 2003 American supernatural horror comedy film directed by Rob Minkoff and written by David Berenbaum, based on Walt Disney's theme park attraction of the same name. The film stars Eddie Murphy as a realtor who, along with his family, becomes trapped in a haunted mansion. Terence Stamp, Wallace Shawn, Marsha Thomason, and Jennifer Tilly appear in supporting roles.

The film was theatrically released in the United States on November 26, 2003, by Buena Vista Pictures Distribution. The film received negative reviews from critics, but performed well at the box office grossing $182.3 million worldwide against a $90 million budget. A reboot directed by Justin Simien is set to be released in July 2023.

Plot
Jim and Sara Evers are successful realtors with two children, Michael and Megan. A workaholic with little time for his family, Jim misses his wedding anniversary and tries to make amends by suggesting a vacation to the nearby lake. Sara is contacted by the occupants of the old Gracey Manor, located in the nearby bayou; Jim, eager to make a deal after learning where the mansion is, takes his family there, meeting its owner, Edward Gracey, his butler Ramsley and his other servants; maid Emma and footman Ezra.

When a rainstorm floods the nearby river, Gracey lets the family stay for the night. Ramsley takes Jim to the library to discuss the deal with Gracey, but Jim becomes trapped in a secret passage. Gracey gives Sara a tour of the mansion, discussing his past and his “grandfather’s” death after the suicide of his lover, Elizabeth Henshaw. Megan and Michael follow a spectral orb to the attic, where they find a portrait of a woman that bears an almost identical resemblance to Sara. Emma and Ezra appear, and identify the woman as the late Elizabeth.

Meanwhile, Jim meets Madame Leota, the ghost of a gypsy whose head is encased in a crystal ball. He runs into Emma, Ezra and his children, and returns to Leota for answers about Elizabeth's likeness to Sara. It is then revealed that the mansion's inhabitants are ghosts, cursed a century ago by Elizabeth's and Gracey's untimely deaths, and can only enter the afterlife when the lovers are reunited; Sara is believed to be Elizabeth's reincarnation. Leota sends the Evers to the mansion's cemetery to find a key that will reveal the truth about Elizabeth's death. In a crypt beneath a mausoleum, Jim and Megan find the key, but inadvertently disturb its undead residents. However, they escape with help from Michael, who overcomes his arachnophobia.

Leota leads them to a trunk in the attic, which Jim unlocks to find a letter Elizabeth wrote to Gracey, revealing she truly loved him and wanted to marry him, indicating that she did not commit suicide as everyone believed. Ramsley then appears and reveals he murdered Elizabeth to prevent Gracey from abandoning his heritage, as he believed their relationship was unacceptable. To hide the truth, Ramsley traps the children in a trunk and literally throws Jim out of the mansion. As Gracey and Sara rendezvous in the ballroom, she is confused when he asks if she recognizes him, and he insists she is his beloved Elizabeth. The room fills with dancing ghosts as Gracey reveals his ghostly self, but Sara denies being Elizabeth. This gives Gracey second thoughts, but Ramsley insists that Sara is Elizabeth and, in time, she will remember. Ramsley then blackmails Sara into marrying Gracey in exchange for her children's safety.

Encouraged by Leota, Jim manages to re-enter the mansion, rescue his children, and stop Sara and Gracey's wedding. He gives Gracey Elizabeth's letter and Ramsley's crime is exposed. As Gracey angrily confronts Ramsley, the latter hypocritically rages at his master's apparent selfishness for loving Elizabeth and summons wraiths to attack the group. However, with the truth revealed, a fiery entity emerges from the ballroom's fireplace and drags Ramsley down to Hell to face eternal punishment. Ramsley attempts to take Jim with him, but he is saved by Gracey. Sara collapses, having been poisoned by Ramsley during the wedding ceremony, but the spectral orb appears and possesses Sara. The orb is revealed to be Elizabeth's ghost, who could only be released from her current form once the truth was revealed, and thanks Jim for saving her. Elizabeth and Gracey reunite as Sara is subsequently revived.

With the curse finally lifted, Gracey gives the Evers the deed to the mansion and departs to Heaven with Elizabeth, Emma, Ezra, and the mansion's other inhabitants. The Evers drive across the Lake Pontchartrain Causeway for a proper vacation, accompanied by Leota and four singing busts that they encountered while searching for the mausoleum, strapped to the back of their car.

Cast
 Eddie Murphy as Jim Evers, a successful yet workaholic real estate agent who is often late for family gatherings, but tries his best to make up for it. 
 Terence Stamp as Ramsley, the ghost of Gracey Manor's butler who serves as a fatherly figure to Master Gracey. He is later revealed to be responsible for Elizabeth's death.
 Nathaniel Parker as Master Edward Gracey, the ghost of Gracey Manor's owner who longs for his lost love, Elizabeth Henshaw, to return to him after her apparent suicide.
 Marsha Thomason as Sara Evers, Jim's disapproving wife who is also his business partner. Thomason also portrays Elizabeth Henshaw, the ghost of Master Gracey's long lost lover who bears a striking resemblance to Sara.
 Jennifer Tilly as Madame Leota, the ghost of a gypsy whose head is encased in her crystal ball.
 Wallace Shawn as Ezra, the ghost of a bumbling footman who worries about getting into trouble.
 Dina Spybey as Emma, the ghost of a nervous but helpful maid who seems terrified of Ramsley.
 Aree Davis as Megan Evers, Jim and Sara's impatient daughter.
 Marc John Jefferies as Michael Evers, Jim and Sara's arachnophobic son. Jefferies based the arachnophobia on Ron Weasley from the Harry Potter series.
 The Dapper Dans as the voices of the Singing Busts.
 Deep Roy, Jeremy Howard, and Clay Martinez as the Hitchhiking Ghosts.
 Corey Burton as the voice of the Ghost Host.

The film's chief makeup artist Rick Baker appears in the graveyard scene as a ghost behind a tombstone, using an appearance based on a portrait of the Ghost Host seen in the attraction. The cast also includes an uncredited Martin Klebba as Pickwick, one the ghosts in the graveyard, albeit unnamed and only known as "Happy Ghost" and director Rob Minkoff's nephew, who appears as the paperboy in the opening scene.

Production

The mansion scenes were filmed at Sable Ranch in Santa Clarita, California. The main building was constructed over a period of weeks while the cupola and chimneys on the top of the mansion were computer-generated. The rest of film was shot in New Orleans and surrounding areas. The mansion's architecture is Renaissance-influenced with a mix of antebellum and Dutch-colonial revival architecture. One evidence of this is the exterior design, which is a mix-up of the attraction's exteriors in both Disneyland and Walt Disney World, with the conservatory being a nod to the latter.

Five Hidden Mickeys are seen throughout the film; the most notable ones being the padlock at the mansion's gates, the second when an axe wielded by an animated suit of armor nearly hits Jim, and a third which is briefly seen when Ramsley poisons a goblet of wine during the wedding ceremony. Two other hidden mickeys are the couch in the library and the windows on the doors Jim passes when he is chased by musical instruments summoned by Madame Leota. Before leaving the mansion via a hearse to find the mausoleum, Ezra exclaims "there's always my way," a pivotal line of dialogue from the attraction.

The costume and special effects designers wanted the ghost characters to become "more dead" the farther they were from the mansion. While Ezra and Emma look human in the house, their leaving it causes them to become blue and transparent. The zombies in the mausoleum were described as the "deadest as they are farthest away". Rick Baker, the chief costume designer, did the prosthetic makeup for the zombies in the mausoleum, using skull heads for the zombie design. He also designed one of the zombies as an elderly man holding a cane in order for the mausoleum scene not to be too frightening to viewers.

This was the first film to air on Disney Channel to contain any profanity besides "hell" or "damn", the "Big ass termites!" line uttered by Jim when he sees the breathing door.

In the opening scene of the film, Nathaniel Parker had great difficulty trying to carry Marsha Thomason up the staircase, which is shown on the expressions of his face. This was due to her slippery silk dress.

Release
The teaser trailer debuted in October 2002 with Tuck Everlasting and on VHS in February 2003.

Reception

Box office
According to Box Office Mojo, The Haunted Mansion grossed $24,278,410 on its opening weekend with an average of $7,776 per theatre in the United States. With the domestic gross at $75,847,266, the film gained more than a quarter of the earnings of its theme-ride predecessor Pirates of the Caribbean: The Curse of the Black Pearl.  The film achieved better in other markets, with an international total of $106,443,000.

Critical response

On Rotten Tomatoes, the film has a rating of 14% based on 140 reviews and an average rating of 4.2/10. The site's critical consensus reads, "Neither scary nor funny, The Haunted Mansion is as lifeless as the ghosts in the movie." On Metacritic, the film has a score of 34 out of 100 based on 34 critics, indicating "generally unfavorable reviews". Audiences polled by CinemaScore gave the film an average grade of "B" on an A+ to F scale.

David Sterritt of Christian Science Monitor wrote "While it may supply giggles and shivers to preteens, grownups should think twice before entering this all-too-haunted house."  Roger Ebert in The Chicago Sun-Times gave the film two and a half stars out of a possible four, writing "The surprising thing about "The Haunted Mansion" isn't that it's based on a Disney theme park ride, but that it has ambition. It wants to be more than a movie version of the ride. I expected an inane series of nonstop action sequences, but what I got was a fairly intriguing story and an actual plot that is actually resolved. That doesn't make the movie good enough to recommend, but it makes it better than the ads suggest." In one of the film's positive reviews, Sheri Linden of Hollywood Reporter called the film "A pleasant and atmospheric family romp, offering enough mildly chilling thrills to keep everyone entertained during its brief running time."

Legacy 
Although considered a critical and box office failure upon its release, The Haunted Mansion has undergone a reassessment over the past several years. Like Clue (1985), The Monster Squad (1987), and Hocus Pocus (1993), all similar dark-yet-broadly-comical films that initially opened to poor reviews and disappointing box office results before growing an appreciative audience over time, The Haunted Mansion has grown in popularity since its original theatrical run and has achieved cult status, as noted by media outlets such as Insider Inc. and Full Circle Cinema.

Author and Disney historian Jeff Baham attributes the film's increased popularity to its original intended audience — the pre-teens and teens who saw it during its initial release and subsequent home video release — who have grown up with an appreciation for the film, and who now, as adults, are introducing it to their own children:

On episode 35 of the Doombuggies podcast, published May 13, 2022 and entitled "The Haunted Mansion Movies," Baham expands on this:

The Haunted Mansion is now a popular Halloween movie and is regularly featured on Halloween season cable programming blocks such as Freeform's 31 Nights of Halloween. The film also appears on many lists of "Best Halloween Movies" (especially the youth-centric lists) including those of Elle, Country Living, Today, We Got This Covered, Woman’s Day, Redbook, Good Housekeeping, and others.

Home media
The film was released on VHS and DVD on April 20, 2004. The film was released on Blu-Ray disc on October 17, 2006.

Reboot

In July 2010, it was announced that a reboot adaptation based on Disney's The Haunted Mansion was in development for Walt Disney Pictures, with Guillermo del Toro as writer and producer. The film remained in development until Ryan Gosling entered early negotiations to star in April 2015, while D.V. DeVincentis was hired to rewrite the script. In September 2016, Brigham Taylor was hired as an additional producer.

In August 2020, it was announced that writer Katie Dippold would write a new screenplay, and that Dan Lin and Jonathan Eirich would co-produce. Justin Simien signed on as director in April 2021, and Tiffany Haddish, Lakeith Stanfield, Owen Wilson, Rosario Dawson, and Danny DeVito had all signed on to star by October that same year. The film is scheduled for release on July 28, 2023.

See also
 List of ghost films

References

External links
 
 
 
 
 
 Movie stills

2003 films
2003 black comedy films
2003 comedy horror films
2000s fantasy comedy films
2000s ghost films
Haunted Mansion
American comedy horror films
Walt Disney Pictures films
Films based on amusement park attractions
American haunted house films
Films directed by Rob Minkoff
Films produced by Don Hahn
Films scored by Mark Mancina
Films set in Louisiana
American black comedy films
American children's comedy films
Films about the afterlife
Films about curses
Films set in country houses
American fantasy comedy films
American supernatural horror films
Southern Gothic films
African-American comedy horror films
American zombie films
Fictional places in Disney films
2000s English-language films
2000s American films